USS Kestrel (AMCU-26) was an  of the United States Navy, later converted to an AMCU-7-class Coastal Minesweeper (Underwater Locator).

The ship was laid down on 7 September 1944 by the New Jersey Shipbuilding Company, of Barber, New Jersey, launched on 6 October 1944, and commissioned as USS LSI(L)-874 on 13 October 1944.

Service history

1944–1946 
Following shakedown and training off the Atlantic coast, LCI(L)-874 departed Key West, Florida on 25 November for the Pacific. She engaged in additional training after arriving San Diego, California on 13 December. Departing on 29 January 1945, she touched Pearl Harbor, Eniwetok, and Guam before arriving Peleliu on 12 April. She performed picket and patrol duty in the Palau Islands during the remaining months of World War II.

From September 1945 to February 1946, LCI(L)-874 operated between the Palau and Mariana Islands, providing mail and shuttle service among the Islands. Departing Eniwetok on 4 February she arrived at San Pedro, California, a month later. Sailing to Oregon in May LCI(L)-874 was decommissioned there on 10 July 1946 and joined the Pacific Reserve Fleet.

1952–1957
She was reclassified as a Coastal Minesweeper (Underwater Locator), and renamed USS Kestrel (AMCU-26) on 7 March 1952. Conversion to AMCU-26 began 24 August 1953 at the Puget Sound Naval Shipyard, Bremerton, Washington, and was completed on 1 March 1954.

Kestrel was recommissioned on 8 February 1954. After shakedown and training, she arrived San Diego, California, on 27 March for operations in the 11th Naval District. From 1954 to 1957, Kestrel operated out of San Diego on underwater mine location exercises. She was reclassified as a Coastal Minehunter, MHC-26, in February 1955.

Kestrel was decommissioned at San Diego on 2 December 1957. She was sold to Murphy Marine Service on 28 June 1960.

References 
 
 

 

AMCU-7-class minesweepers
Ships built in Perth Amboy, New Jersey
1944 ships
World War II amphibious warfare vessels of the United States
Cold War mine warfare vessels of the United States